Henry F. Johnson was a member of the Wisconsin State Assembly.

Biography
Johnson was born on March 5, 1860, in Norway, Wisconsin. He would become a farmer in the area. Additionally, he was involved in the insurance and telephone industries. Johnson was an active Lutheran. He died on March 6, 1941, in Racine, Wisconsin.

Electoral career
Johnson was a member of the Assembly from 1919 to 1923. Previously, he had been Chairman (similar to Mayor) of Norway and a member of the Racine County, Wisconsin Board of Supervisors from 1896 to 1903. Other positions Johnson held include school board member. He was a Republican.

References

People from Norway, Wisconsin
Republican Party members of the Wisconsin State Assembly
Mayors of places in Wisconsin
County supervisors in Wisconsin
School board members in Wisconsin
American Lutherans
20th-century Lutherans
Farmers from Wisconsin
1860 births
1941 deaths